Wilfrid Coulot (born 25 June 1986 in Besançon, France) is a French curler and curling coach. He also competed as a cyclist.

Teams

Men's

Mixed doubles

Record as a coach of national teams

Personal life
His sisters Solène and Marie were also curlers. Wilfrid was the coach of their team for several years.

References

External links

Living people
1986 births
Sportspeople from Besançon
French male curlers
French curling coaches
French male cyclists